The 1875–76 Football Association Challenge Cup was the fifth staging of the FA Cup, England's oldest football tournament. Thirty-two teams entered, three more than the previous season, although five of the thirty-two never played a match.

Format

The fifth ever FA Cup was a straight knockout tournament. Semi-finals and final were played at neutral venues.

First round

Replay

Second round

Third round

Semi-finals

Final

Replay

References
 FA Cup Results Archive 

1875-76
1875–76 in English football
FA Cup